Ashley Bouder (born December 10, 1983) is an American ballet dancer who is currently a principal dancer at the New York City Ballet. She also founded and currently runs her own project, The Ashley Bouder Project.

Early life
Ashley Bouder was born in Carlisle, Pennsylvania. She started  ballet when she was six, at the Central Pennsylvania Youth Ballet. In 1999, she attended the School of American Ballet, and was invited to stay and train at the winter session.

Career

New York City Ballet 
Bouder joined the New York City Ballet as an apprentice in June 2000, and was promoted to the corps de ballet four months later. She was named a soloist in 2004 and a principal dancer the following year. She has danced Balanchine works such as The Nutcracker and Serenade, and new works such as Alexei Ratmansky's Concerto DSCH and Justin Peck's Pulcinella Variations. In 2019, she won the Prix Benois de la Danse for dancing the role of Swanida in Coppélia.

The Ashley Bouder Project 
Bouder helms her own small company, The Ashley Bouder Project, that has mounted several innovative ballet productions in New York over the years, primarily centered on commissioning new works by women choreographers and composers, including her own. Dancers involved with the project include Bouder's NYCB colleagues, such as Sara Mearns, Taylor Stanley and Andrew Veyette. Notable appearances have been at the Joyce Theater in 2015. and at The Symphony Space in 2017, in collaboration with The New York Jazzharmonic. This was the first time that an entire evening of ballet in varied styles was set solely to the accompaniment of a jazz orchestra.

Other ventures 
Bouder has called upon ballet to embrace Feminism.

She is a resident fellow at the Center for Ballet and the Arts at New York University.

Awards

 Mae L. Wien Award for Outstanding Promise, 2000 
 Janice Levin Dancer Honoree, 2002-2003
 Prix Benois de la Danse, 2019

Personal life
She is married to financier Peter de Florio and gave birth to their daughter, Violet Storm de Florio, on May 4, 2016. As of 2018, she is studying political science at Fordham University part-time.

Selected repertoire
Bouder's repertoire with the New York City Ballet includes:

References

External links
The Ashley Bouder Project website
Ashley Bouder - New York City Ballet profile
NYC Ballet Screen Test: Ashley Bouder
Ashley Bouder and Daniel Ulbricht in Flame of Paris
Ashley Bouder on Serenade

American ballerinas
New York City Ballet principal dancers
School of American Ballet alumni
Mae L. Wien Award recipients
Janice Levin Award dancers
Living people
1983 births
Dancers from Pennsylvania
People from Carlisle, Pennsylvania
21st-century American ballet dancers
Prix Benois de la Danse winners
Prima ballerinas
21st-century American women